Marie Joseph Gustave Adolphe Lambert (1 July 1824 – 27 January 1871) was a French hydrographer.
He taught for 20 years, then went on a voyage into Arctic seas and conceived the idea of an expedition to the North Pole. He thought that in summer the effect of the constant sunshine (insolation) would be to melt the ice and allow passage to the Pole. The plans had been made, about half the funding had been subscribed, and a ship had been purchased when the project was disrupted by the Franco-Prussian War in 1870. Lambert enlisted in the National Guard and died of wounds at the Battle of Buzenval (1871).

Early years

Gustave Lambert was born in Grièges, Ain, on 1 July 1824. He was the son of Jean-Francois Lambert, a notary from Paris, and Rosalie Blanc. 
The family moved from Grieges to Priay, Ain, around 1825. In 1835 Gustave's father became a manufacturer of sugar, and later of candles. 
These businesses were not successful, and in 1840 his father retired to Lyon.
Gustave attended the Collège de Bourg, where he is recorded as a pupil of elementary mathematics in 1842 
He was admitted to the École Polytechnique in 1843. 
Due to problems with discipline, he was expelled from the Polytechnique on 23 April 1845.

Teacher

Lambert  joined the navy, and became a teacher 4th class of hydrography at Belle-Isle on 21 November 1846.
He first went to sea around 1847. On 8 November 1847 he transferred to teach at Fécamp. He was in Paris during the February Revolution of 1848, which he opposed. On 10 October 1848 he was named a teacher at the École Navale in Brest. There he taught differential and integral calculus. On 1 October 1851 he was promoted to teacher 3rd class, and on 3 July 1852 to teacher 2nd class. On 13 September 1856 he moved from the chair of hydrography at Cherbourg to that of Bayonne.
He taught hydrography at Bayonne until 1 January 1865, when he was laid off.

Visit to Bering Strait

Louis Vivien de Saint-Martin described Lambert as both a man of action and a man of science.
Soon after losing his job in 1865 Lambert went to sea as a passenger on a French whaling ship bound for the arctic seas.
During the voyage the captain died and Lambert took command.
He explored the north of the Bering Strait in 1865.
He was in charge of rough and undisciplined seamen in difficult and poorly charted waters, but found time to compose a paper on the Lois de l'insolation (Laws of solar irradiance) which was communicated in abbreviated form to the Academy of Sciences on 28 January 1867.
He noted that while sea temperatures were relatively stable in the tropics, they fluctuated much more widely towards the poles.
He also observed that icebergs were born on land and died in the ocean, while ice fields were formed and dissolved at sea.

Concept of the journey to the North Pole

It was around this time that Lambert began to think about an expedition to the North Pole.
He outlined his plan later, for an expedition with about 15 sailors and scientists:

Samuel Richard Van Campen wrote in 1878 of the plan,

Publicity, planning and fundraising
In December 1866 Lambert gave an outline of his plans to the Société de géographie of Paris.
Lambert described the whole history of Arctic exploration, gave the scientific grounds for his plan, and described the importance of a French expedition through the Bering Straits. 
He insisted that there was open sea to the northwest of the straits in the direction of the Pole, and said that insolation during the Arctic summer and favorable currents would make it possible to avoid the barriers of broken ice that had blocked the passage in the past.
On 4 July 1867 Lambert wrote to M. de Quatrefages, President of the Council of the Geographical Society, praising the "heureux point de départ acquis à la question du Pôle Nord" created by the formation of a Committee of Patronage.
Committee members included Antoine Thomson d'Abbadie, Jacques Babinet, Jean-Baptiste Élie de Beaumont, Edmond Becquerel, Gabriel Auguste Daubrée, Gaétan Delaunay, Hervé Faye, Charles Joseph Sainte-Claire Deville, Paul-Auguste-Ernest Laugier, Claude-Louis Mathieu, Louis Ferdinand Alfred Maury and Jean Louis Armand de Quatrefages de Bréau.

On 20 December 1867 Lambert spoke at more length to the Société de géographie and described his plans for the proposed polar voyage and the research he wanted to undertake.
He presented his plan in other parts of France, for example to an audience of 4,000 people in the hall of the Bourse de Bordeaux on 19 February 1868.
His letters were published in l'Economiste Français and reproduced in La Gironde.
On 14 and 28 February 1870 Lambert described to the Académie française how he proposed to measure the flattening of the earth at the pole by measuring the meridian arc and by timing the duration of oscillation of a pendulum of fixed length.
He would make other measurements such as air pressure, magnetism and the northern aurora.
August Heinrich Petermann, director of the Gotha Geographical Review, wrote from Germany to the Société de géographie expressing his approval of the plan.

Lambert estimated that the cost would be 600,000 francs, and sought funding from all sources.
The Marquis Prosper de Chasseloup-Laubat, former Minister of the Marine and President of the Geographical Council, joined with de Quatrefages in presenting the project to the Emperor.
Napoleon III placed his name at the head of the list of subscribers, promising 50,000 francs.
The Corps législatif voted 150,000 francs.
Lambert tried to engage the public imagination by floating a huge airship, the Pôle Nord, from the Champ de Mars.
The vaudeville performers and caricaturists took to the project, but the general public remained indifferent.

However, having raised about 300,000 francs Lambert bought a ship that he named the Boréal which he docked at Le Havre.
He published a circular in which he announced that the Boreal was waiting to leave from the Vauban basin at Le Havre, and could depart in a matter of weeks rather than months. 
All that was needed was a contribution of about 6,000 francs from each department.
The Seine-Inférieure had already given 23,000 francs.
Donations had been received from Paris, 46,000 francs; Lyon, 17,000 francs; le Havre, 8,000 frances; Rouen, 7,000 francs.
On 14 July 1870 the Corps législatif voted a supplementary credit of 100,000 francs for the expedition to the North Pole.
When the war with Prussia broke out Lambert had raised almost 400,000 francs.
He had started to outfit his ship for the Arctic, had hired a skillful sailor as his deputy, had hired several other people but did not have enough money to continue.

Death and legacy

The Franco-Prussian War broke out on 19 July 1870 when Lambert was in Bordeaux.
Although he was 46 years old, he joined a company of francs-tireurs.
His company left Bordeaux on 29 September for Tours, then was sent to the east.
Lambert felt he would be more useful in Paris, which he reached before it was besieged.
He was first named captain of the 85th battalion of the National Guard, then Colonel d'état-major.
At the start of December 1870 he turned down the title of Colonel of the Veterans of the National Guard, and enlisted with the 119th Infantry Regiment.
On 21 December 1870 he was made a sergeant.
He was serving with the 119th infantry when he was mortally wounded in Buzenval Park.
He was treated by the surgeon Auguste Nélaton, who was optimistic about his chances, but died at 3:00 in the afternoon.

At the time of Lambert's death on 19 January 1871 it was already clear that France's capitulation was inevitable.
His funeral was held on 30 January 1871, when his body was taken to the Père Lachaise Cemetery.
A bronze bust of the explorer was placed on his tomb. 
Some time before 1895 the body was exhumed and taken to a plot provided by the city of Paris, with the bust replaced by a broken column.
A monument was erected to Lambert in the Père Lachaise Cemetery in January 1924.

Publications

Publications by Gustave Lambert  include:

Notes

Citations

Sources

1824 births
1871 deaths
People from Grièges 
French sailors
French hydrographers
French people of the Franco-Prussian War
Burials at Père Lachaise Cemetery